HMS Tattoo was an  of the Royal Navy during the Second World War. She was laid down by Gulf Shipbuilding Corporation (Chickasaw, Alabama) on 8 June 1942 as BAM-32 and launched on 27 January 1943. She was transferred to the Royal Navy and commissioned as HMS Tattoo on 26 October 1943.

Tattoo served for part of World War II patrolling off Iceland. At one point, she returned to Britain for repairs to a fouled propeller.

She returned to the United States in 1947, sold to the Turkish Navy in March 1947 as a survey ship and renamed TCG Çarşamba (AGS-1, later A-594).

She was stricken from the Naval Register in 1985.

References

External links 
 Flickr
 uboat.net
 NavSource
 MaritimeQuest

Auk-class minesweepers
1943 ships
Ships built in Chickasaw, Alabama
Catherine-class minesweepers
World War II minesweepers of the United Kingdom
Ships transferred from the United States Navy to the Turkish Navy